Svit is a small town in Poprad District in the Prešov Region in northern Slovakia.

History
Svit is one of the youngest Slovak towns. It was established in 1934 by business industrialist Jan Antonín Baťa of Zlín, Czechoslovakia (now Czech Republic) through his organization Baťa a.s., Zlin in accordance with his policy of setting up villages around the country for his workers. As a boy, Jan Baťa saw the poverty and sickness of his fellow countrymen. He wanted to change this by creating cities full of the most modern factories and filled with the best (and happiest) workers in Europe. The Baťa System under Jan's administration brought prosperity first to Moravia, and later Slovakia and Bohemia.  It was Jan's policy for full employment that drove him to create each Baťa town for a different purpose: Shoes, Rubber and Tires, Textiles, Airplanes, Chemicals, Plastics, Media, Stockings, Leather, Machinery.

When the World War II came, Jan Baťa's policy was to secretly fund the Czechoslovak government-in-exile, to supply the Czech Army with shoes and clothing and to secretly fund the Slovak National Uprising that started at Baťovany (now Partizánske) on August 29, 1944. Jan Baťa represented Czech/Slovak freedom and prosperity.

Svit is short for "Slovenské vizkózové továrne" (in English Slovak Viscose Works). (Also, the word svit means 'shine' in Slovak) Svit is the smallest town in Slovakia (4.5 km²) with the population of 7,790.

Demographics
According to the 2001 census, the town had 7,445 inhabitants. 96.44% of inhabitants were Slovaks, 1.11% Romani and 0.79% Czechs. The religious make-up was 62.53% Roman Catholics, 20.67% people with no religious affiliation, 8.62% Lutherans and 4.00% Greek Catholics.

Churches 

 Roman Catholic Church of st. Joseph
 Roman Catholic Church of st. Cyril and Methodius
 Greek Catholic Chapel of st. Cyril and Methodius
 Lutheran Church

Sports
The town is home to the professional basketball team BK Iskra Svit, which plays in the Slovak Extraliga.

Twin towns — sister cities

Svit is twinned with:
 Česká Třebová, Czech Republic
 Knurów, Poland
 Partizánske, Slovakia
 San Lorenzo in Campo, Italy

See also 
Partizánske - Another Slovak town founded by the Bata Shoes company.
List of company towns

References

External links
 Official website of Svit (in Slovak only)

Cities and towns in Slovakia
Villages and municipalities in Poprad District
Bata Corporation
New towns started in the 1930s